The 2019/20 FIS Freestyle Ski World Cup was the fortieth World Cup season in freestyle skiing organised by International Ski Federation. The season started on 6 September 2019 and finished on 8 March 2020. This season include six disciplines: moguls, aerials, ski cross, halfpipe, slopestyle and big air.

Men

Ski Cross

Moguls

Dual Moguls

Aerials

Halfpipe

Slopestyle

Big Air

Ladies

Ski Cross

Moguls

Dual Moguls

Aerials

Halfpipe

Slopestyle

Big Air

Team

Team Aerials

Men's standings

Overall

Ski Cross

Ski Cross Alps Tour

Moguls

Aerials

Halfpipe

Slopestyle

Big Air

Ladies' standings

Overall

Ski Cross

Ski Cross Alps Tour

Moguls

Aerials

Halfpipe

Slopestyle

Big Air

Nations Cup

Overall

References 

FIS Freestyle Skiing World Cup
World Cup
World Cup